Ponentina subvirescens is a species of small air-breathing land snail, a terrestrial pulmonate gastropod mollusk in the family Geomitridae.

Distribution
This species is known to occur in a number of countries and islands including:
 Great Britain
 Channel Islands
 France
 Spain

References

 AnimalBase info at: 

Geomitridae
Gastropods described in 1839